Diódoro Humberto Carrasco Altamirano (born 30 January 1954) is a Mexican economist and politician from the National Action Party (formerly from the Institutional Revolutionary Party) who has served as Governor of Oaxaca from 1992 to 1998 and as Secretary of the Interior during the last year of Ernesto Zedillo's government.

He also has served as Senator of the LV Legislature of the Mexican Congress and as Deputy during the LX Legislature.

References

1954 births
Living people
Politicians from Oaxaca
20th-century Mexican economists
Governors of Oaxaca
Mexican Secretaries of the Interior
Members of the Senate of the Republic (Mexico) for Oaxaca
Members of the Chamber of Deputies (Mexico) for Oaxaca
Institutional Revolutionary Party politicians
National Action Party (Mexico) politicians
21st-century Mexican politicians
Instituto Tecnológico Autónomo de México alumni
20th-century Mexican politicians
Deputies of the LX Legislature of Mexico